Ooredoo QSC (formerly Qtel) is a Qatari multinational telecommunications company headquartered in Doha. Ooredoo provides mobile, wireless, wire line, and content services with market share in domestic and international telecommunication markets, and in business (corporations and individuals) and residential markets.

It was the first operator globally to launch commercial 5G services in Qatar and is one of the world's largest mobile telecommunications companies, with over 121 million customers worldwide as of 2021.

Ooredoo has operations in 10 countries across the Middle East, North Africa, and Southeast Asia, including Algeria, Indonesia, Iraq, Kuwait, Myanmar, Maldives, Oman, Palestine (a de jure sovereign state), Qatar, and Tunisia.

Ooredoo's shares are listed on the Qatar Stock Exchange and the Abu Dhabi Securities Exchange.

History 

Ooredoo was founded in Doha in 1987 initially as a telephone exchange company. It has since grown to become the largest communications operator in Qatar offering new technologies to the country including mobile, broadband, digital, and fibre services. The publicly-traded company has ownership from the royal family with H.E. Sheikh Abdullah Bin Mohammed Bin Saud Al Thani as the company's chairman and Sheikh Saud bin Nasser Al Thani as Ooredoo Group CEO. Waleed Al-Sayed is Ooredoo Group's deputy CEO and Ooredoo Qatar's CEO.

Qtel Group and all its operating companies worldwide were officially unified under Ooredoo Group in February 2013, as part of the company's strategy to combine its assets in order to form a global business within the telecommunications industry. The name Ooredoo is Arabic for "I Want", chosen "to reflect the aspirations of Ooredoo customers and the core belief that Ooredoo can enrich people's lives and stimulate human growth in the communities where it operates."

Ooredoo has experienced significant growth over the last six years, transforming from a single market operator in Qatar to an international communications company with a global customer base of more than 114 million customers worldwide (as of September 2015) and consolidated revenues of QAR 24.2 billion for the first nine months of fiscal year 2015.

In 2010 the company upgraded its 3G network in the country and launched its Mobile Money service. By 2012, its network grew with its fibre network that provided services with download speeds of up to 100 Mbit/s, HDTV, and its initial phase of its 4G LTE mobile broadband service.  The company's consumer base has grown significantly in recent times, from 1.9 million subscribers in 2008 to 2.5 million in 2012 within Qatar. Its annual revenues increased by QAR 3.5 billion from 2012 to 2013 in a single quarter.

As of 2013, the company unified under Ooredoo Group.

Current standing
Ooredoo made history when it became the first operator in the world to launch a live 5G network in May 2018. Ooredoo has been gearing up to test this new generation of 5G wireless technology since 2014. The 5G network has already been commercially launched in Qatar   and Kuwait.

In the 2010s the company has developed a strong partnership with Nokia in Qatar. In May 2016, the firm expanded this partnership with Nokia in a three-year deal to develop a nationwide mobile network in Qatar.  The firm has also broadened its reach with its operations on over 16 countries across the Persian Gulf, Middle East, North Africa, and Asia regions.

The firm has since experienced significant growth with QAR 24.2 billion in revenues in the first three quarters of 2015, and over 17,000 employees.

Ownership
According to Ooredoo's 2016 disclosures, 68% of the company is owned by Qatar government-related entities, 10% by ADIA (UAE), and the remaining 22% is on the public market.

Operating companies

Middle East

Ooredoo Qatar

Qtel was formally established under Law No. 13 of 1987.

In 2006, Qtel launched 3G services and announced a series of initiatives, including an equity partnership with AT&T in NavLink, international high- speed mobile data (GPRS) roaming services and the launch of IP (Internet Protocol) and telephony services.

In 2010, Qtel launched its Mobile Money service and upgraded its 3G network.

In 2012, Qtel continued its roll-out of the nationwide Qtel Fibre network, offering packages with download speeds of up to 300 Mbit/s and HDTV + ooredoo TV . Qtel also began the trial phase of its 4G LTE mobile broadband service.

In February 2013, Qtel officially rebranded as Ooredoo.

In 2015, Ooredoo Qatar announced the launch of Ooredoo SuperNet in one of the most significant network evolution in Qatar's history. The company introduced three-band carrier aggregation, building on its position of being the first and only company to combine 20+10 MHz bands on its 4G+ network.

On July 7, 2017, at the beginning of the Qatar diplomatic crisis, Ooredoo changed its network name to Tamim Almajd in a show of solidarity with the Emir Sheikh Tamim bin Hamad Al Thani.

In January 2020, Ooredoo Qatar signed a partnership with Indian entertainment and media platform Eros Now, to make Eros Now's content available to its customers in Qatar.

On 30 September 2021, Ooredoo Group announced that the title of Qatar's first-ever Formula 1 race will be officially named as the Formula 1 Ooredoo Qatar Grand Prix. The announcement was made at a press conference at the Losail International Circuit in the presence of the Deputy Group CEO and CEO of Ooredoo Qatar Mr. Sheikh Mohammed Bin Abdulla Al Thani & other officials.

Ooredoo Oman 

Ooredoo Oman was formerly known as Nawras, which was launched in Oman in 2004. The company has been listed on the Muscat Securities Market since 2010.

In November 2014, Nawras officially rebranded as Ooredoo Oman.

Ooredoo Oman provides landline voice services to business and residential customers. It also provides a range of prepaid and post-paid mobile phone plans, and broadband internet service, both home and mobile (3G+).

Ooredoo Oman has recently launched full-fledged home entertainment TV services - using set top boxes for home TV, and using apps for Android and iOS mobile devices. It is the first operator in the Middle East region to have launched TV services (including live TV channels and video on demand) from multiple content providers using completely Over The Top (OTT) technology - thus being able to offer its TV services not just for its own broadband and mobile customers, but to other competing operator subscribers too. Its TV content providers include (but not limited to) StarzPlay, YuppTV, Alt Balaji, BluTV, Al Jazeera, EuroNews, FranceTV, ErosNow, FilmBox, Hopster, Spuul - and more are being added regularly.

The home broadband and voice service is powered by WiMAX (Worldwide Interoperability for Microwave Access) technology. Ooredoo Oman was first to deploy 3G+ in Oman and is the only operator to deploy WiMAX commercially in Oman.

Ooredoo Kuwait 

Ooredoo Kuwait's operations began in December 1999 as Wataniya Telecom when it launched wireless services as the second operator in the country.

In March 2007, Ooredoo acquired Kuwait's Wataniya Telecom for US$3.8 billion.

In May 2014, Wataniya Telecom officially re branded as Ooredoo Kuwait.

Asiacell (Ooredoo Iraq) 
Asiacell, the first mobile telecommunications company in Iraq, was established in Sulaymaniyah in 1999.

In August 2007, Asiacell bid and won a 15-year national license, becoming the GSM telecom operator with the largest long-term network coverage in Iraq. To handle new business operations, Asiacell also simultaneously established new executive offices in Baghdad, Basra, and other major cities in Iraq.
</ref>

Ooredoo Palestine

Ooredoo United Arab Emirates 
On September 12, 2019, Ooredoo launched in the Emirates thanks to its joint communication and to make the UAE one of the most connected countries in the Gulf Cooperation Council region, despite the UAE's participation in the Qatar blockade. In August 2021, it changed its name to E-mobile and belongs to the VEON Group.

North Africa

Ooredoo Algeria 

Ooredoo Algeria's operations began in 2004 as Nedjma, positioned as the first multimedia operator in Algeria.

In November 2013, Nedjma officially re branded as Ooredoo Algeria.

Ooredoo Algeria introduced the first EDGE network in the country in 2004 and launched 3G services in Algeria in December 2013.

Ooredoo Tunisia 

Ooredoo Tunisia was founded in May 2002 as Tunisiana and began commercial operations in December the same year.

In April 2014, Tunisiana officially rebranded as Ooredoo Tunisia.

South Asia

Ooredoo Maldives 

Ooredoo Maldives' operations began in February 2005 as Wataniya Maldives, after it was selected during a competitive bidding process with three other companies.

In December 2013, Wataniya Telecom officially re branded as Ooredoo Maldives.

Southeast Asia

Indosat Ooredoo Hutchison

Indosat was founded in 1967 and began as a commercial international telecommunications service provider (IDD) in September 1969. It is partially owned by the Indonesian government and was owned by American conglomerate company ITT until 1980.

In November 2015, Indosat officially rebranded as Indosat Ooredoo. Indosat Ooredoo is the second largest mobile network operator in Indonesia, with a subscriber's strength of 58.0 million users.

In September 2021, Indosat announced its merger with Hutchison Asia Telecom Group/Garibaldi Thohir's joint venture PT Hutchison 3 Indonesia (which operates 3-branded networks in Indonesia) to form Indosat Ooredoo Hutchison and closed their merger on 4 January 2022.

Ooredoo Myanmar

In June 2013, Ooredoo was chosen as one of the two successful applicants among 90 bidders to be awarded a license to operate in Myanmar, considered one of Asia's last remaining greenfield telecom markets.

Formal licenses were granted in January 2014, and Ooredoo pledged an investment of $15 billion to develop Myanmar's telecoms sector, with plans to cover 75 per cent of the population in five years.

Ooredoo will no longer operate in Myanmar due to the junta problems which is leading to financial problems as of 2022.

Sponsorships
Lionel Messi has worked with Ooredoo since 2013 as their global brand ambassador. As part of the partnership, Ooredoo and the Leo Messi Foundation have developed and sponsored projects to stimulate human growth and development across the Middle East, North Africa and Southeast Asia.

Ooredoo have sponsored Paris Saint-Germain since 2013 as a premium partner, with Ooredoo's logo featuring on the back of their football kits.

The company is also the title sponsor of the Qatar Grand Prix.

In 2020, the company appointed Ali bin Towar al-Kuwari as its brand ambassador.

Notes

References

External links
 

 
Qatari brands
Internet service providers
Internet service providers of Qatar
Companies listed on the Abu Dhabi Securities Exchange
Companies listed on the Qatar Stock Exchange
Telecommunications companies of Qatar
Software companies established in 1987
Qatari companies established in 1987
Multinational companies headquartered in Qatar